Corn lily is a common name for several plants and may refer to:
 Clintonia borealis
 Ixia spp.
 Veratrum spp.